Camp Connolly, near Atlanta, Georgia, was home to the US Army "Atlanta Ordnance Depot".

While Camp Connolly was not one of the new World War II camps, it had been used by the Army for many years as an ordnance depot.  When the United States declared war, it mushroomed into a training camp for Ordnance Troops with numerous barracks and buildings being built. In spite of this increase in barracks space, there was insufficient room for new recruits and some training units were housed in a section of the camp known as "Tent City".

The slogan at Connolly was "To Survive, you must know. To know, you must train. Training never ceases".

US Army Units activated or assigned

References
,

Closed installations of the United States Army